Bocana is a genus of moths of the family Erebidae. The genus was erected by Francis Walker in 1859.

Species
Bocana alpipalpalis (Pagenstecher, 1884)
Bocana linusalis Walker, [1859]
Bocana longicornis Holloway, 2008
Bocana manifestalis Walker, 1858
Bocana marginata (Leech, 1900)
Bocana silenusalis Walker, 1859
Bocana umbrina Tams, 1924

References

Herminiinae